Western whipbird may refer to the following bird species and subspecies:

 Psophodes nigrogularis, the black-throated whipbird
 subspecies: Psophodes nigrogularis nigrogularis, 'western heath'
 subspecies: Psophodes nigrogularis oberon, 'western mallee'
 Psophodes leucogaster, white-bellied whipbird
 subspecies: Psophodes leucogaster leucogaster, 'southern mainland'
 subspecies: Psophodes leucogaster lashmari, 'Kangaroo Island'

Birds by common name